John Wilson (born October 26, 1977 in Seneca, South Carolina) is a retired American soccer player who spent the majority of his career with the Charleston Battery, playing mostly as a left fullback. Wilson finished his career with 269 appearances for Charleston, second only to Dusty Hudock in club history.

Career

College
Wilson was raised in Seneca, South Carolina and played college soccer at nearby Clemson University as a forward. During his time with the Tigers, Wilson helped them to an ACC Championship and an appearance in the NCAA Final Eight (1998). He tallied 18 goals and 35 assists in his college career.

Professional
Wilson was drafted by the MLS side Kansas City Wizards in 1999 but chose instead to stay in South Carolina and play for the A-League side Charleston Battery, where he was converted into a left back and voted defender of the year by the fans in his debut season. During the 2000 season, Wilson played briefly on loan with the Kansas City Wizards (who went on to capture the MLS Cup that year), a local Raleigh squad, Raleigh Capital Express and the MLS Pro 40 team.

In 2001 and 2002, Wilson was again voted Charleston's best defensive player in 2002. Wilson also played very briefly on loan with MLS side New England Revolution during 2002, when he tallied his lone MLS goal. Wilson helped Charleston win the A-League Championship in 2003 and was an All-League First Team defender. In 2004, Wilson joined another A-League side, Rochester Raging Rhinos.

On May 27, 2005, Wilson signed with D.C. United in Major League Soccer, where he played mostly left back and some left midfield. Wilson played in the Copa Sudamericana for United, appearing in both games versus the Chilean side, Universidad Católica. Wilson also logged significant time with the DC United reserve team, and aided them in their efforts to win the inaugural MLS Reserve Division title.

After being sidelined by a series of injuries, Wilson was waived by DC on June 26, 2007, and returned to Charleston prior to the 2008 season. Wilson would play a further seven seasons with the Battery, frequently serving as the squad's captain.

Wilson first announced his retirement following the 2010 season but reconsidered and signed a new contract with Charleston on March 3, 2011. On September 13, 2012 John Wilson announced a second retirement from the Charleston Battery but rejoined the team for the 2013 season. He would retire for the last time following the 2014 season, with the Battery's final home match of the year serving as a testimonial in honor of Wilson's contributions to the club. Wilson remains involved with the club as an assistant to head coach Mike Anhaeuser.

Honors

D.C. United
Major League Soccer Supporter's Shield (1): 2006

Charleston Battery
A-League Champions (1): 2003
USL Second Division Champions (1): 2010
USL Second Division Regular Season Champions (1): 2010
USL Pro Champions: 2012

References

External links
 Charleston Battery bio

1977 births
Living people
People from Seneca, South Carolina
African-American soccer players
Clemson Tigers men's soccer players
Soccer players from South Carolina
D.C. United players
Sporting Kansas City players
New England Revolution players
Raleigh (Capital) Express players
Rochester New York FC players
Charleston Battery players
Major League Soccer players
USL First Division players
USL Second Division players
USL Championship players
MLS Pro-40 players
A-League (1995–2004) players
Sporting Kansas City draft picks
Association football wingers
American soccer players